The Skolkovo Institute of Science and Technology, or Skoltech, is a private institute located in Moscow, Russia. Skoltech was established in 2011 as part of a multi-year partnership with the Massachusetts Institute of Technology (MIT) and is among the top 100 young universities in the world, according to Nature Index, ranking 65th in 2021. That same year Skoltech entered the subject ranking in physics for the first time (35th place), and named a rapidly rising university (21st place). February 2022 MIT ended its partnership with Skoltech in protest of the Russian invasion of Ukraine.

History 
Skoltech began as a joint effort with a curriculum designed by MIT and financial backing from the Russian government. The school offers graduate degrees only, and teaching is in English. It serves as the centerpiece of a $2.7 billion innovation hub funded by the Russian Finance Ministry. By 2013, the university had hired 30 to 35 professors and established a campus  from the Red Square near Odintsovo. It is the first work in Russia for the Swiss practice and the result of an international competition. In 2019, the university won the first prize for the Prix Versailles in the "University Campus" category.

The university is also known for designing and operating a petaflop supercomputer, Zhores, considered one of the largest in Russia. In 2020, twenty-three researchers landed on the global top 2% list by citation impact. As a result, by 2021, the university had entered the QS World University Rankings by subject.

MIT terminated the partnership in February 2022 as a response to the 2022 Russian invasion of Ukraine

Degree programs
Skoltech offers Master of Science (MSc) and Doctor of Philosophy (PhD) degrees in several different areas.

The list of MSc degree programs includes: 

PhD degree programs include:
 Mathematics and Mechanics
 Physics
 Materials Science and Engineering
 Life Sciences
 Computational and Data Science and Engineering
 Engineering Systems
 Petroleum Engineering

Centers for Research, Education and Innovation (CREIs)
The institute's education, research, and innovation activities revolve around Centers for Research, Education and Innovation (CREIs), 5 Project Centers and 1 Center. These centers were developed to advance the aims of pursuing innovative research, delivering scientific growth, and generating world-class educational programs. 

 Center for Artificial Intelligence Technology (AI Center) 
 Center for Molecular and Cellular Biology (Bio Center)
 Vladimir Zelman Center for Neurobiology and Brain Rehabilitation (Neuro Center)
 Center for Digital Engineering (Engineering Center)
 Center for Petroleum Science and Engineering (Petroleum Center)
 Center for Materials Technologies (Materials Center)
 Center for Photonics Science and Engineering (Photonics Center)
 Center for Engineering Physics (Physics Center)
 Project Center for Next Generation Wireless and IoT (Wireless Center)
 Project Center for Agro Technologies (Agro Center) 
 Project Center for Energy Transition and ESG (ESG Center)
 Center for Energy Science and Technology (Energy Center) 
 Research Center in artificial intelligence in the direction of optimization of management decisions to reduce the carbon footprint (Applied AI Center)
 Advanced Studies

Notable faculty
 Artem Oganov
 Ivan Oseledets
 Artem Abakumov

 Evgeny Antipov

 Olga Dontsova 
 Evgeny Feygin 
 Aleksandr Gayfullin 
 Mikhail Gelfand 
 Maxim Kazaryan
 Alexander Kuleshov
 Sergey Lando 
 Konstantin Lukyanov 
 Albert Nasibulin 
 Robert Nigmatulin 
 Evgeny Nikolaev 
 Stanislav Smirnov
 Mikhail Spasennykh 
 Gleb Sukhorukov

Leadership
 Alexander Kuleshov, President

 Alexey Sitnikov (Vice President for Communications and Community Development)
 Tatiana Zakharova (Senior Vice President for Finance and Operations)
 Aleksander Safonov (Senior Vice President for Development)
 Lawrence Stein (Vice President for International Business Affairs, Intellectual Property)
 Alexey Ponomarev (Senior Vice President for Industrial Cooperation)
 Mikhail Gelfand (Vice President for Biomedical Research)
 Clement Fortin (Dean of Education)
 Denis Stolyarov (Dean of Students)
 Grigory Kabatyanskiy (Vice President for Academic Relations)
 Pavlos Lagoudakis (Vice President for Photonics)

References

Research institutes in Russia
Universities in Moscow
Technical universities and colleges in Russia